is a railway station in Takehara, Hiroshima Prefecture, Japan.

Lines
West Japan Railway Company
Kure Line

History 
Akinagahama station opened on 1 October 1994.

References 

Railway stations in Hiroshima Prefecture
Railway stations in Japan opened in 1994